Erich Schönfelder (1885–1933) was a German screenwriter, actor, and film director of the silent and early sound eras. Early in his career he worked frequently with Ernst Lubitsch.

Selected filmography

Writer
 Shoe Palace Pinkus (1916)
 When Four Do the Same (1917)
 My Wife, the Movie Star (1919)
 Meyer from Berlin (1919)
 Love at the Wheel (1921)

Actor
 The Golem and the Dancing Girl (1917)
The Toboggan Cavalier (1918)
 Ruth's Two Husbands (1919)
 Hunted Men (1924)
 Struggle for the Soil (1925)
 Fight of the Tertia (1929)
 The Copper (1930)

Director
 The Bull of Olivera (1921)
 Miss Rockefeller Is Filming (1922)
 In the Name of the King (1924)
 Women of Luxury (1925)
 The Woman with That Certain Something (1925)
 Princess Trulala (1926)
 Grandstand for General Staff (1926)
 Marie's Soldier (1927)
 How Do I Marry the Boss? (1927)
 The Woman from Till 12 (1928)
 Der Ladenprinz (1928)
 The Beaver Coat (1928)
 From a Bachelor's Diary (1929)
 Come Back, All Is Forgiven (1929)
 Busy Girls (1930)
 Next, Please! (1930)
 Mischievous Miss (1930)
 A Crafty Youth (1931)
 Contest (1932)
 At Your Orders, Sergeant (1932)

Bibliography
 Hake, Sabine Passions and Deceptions: The Early Films of Ernst Lubitsch. Princeton University Press, 1992.  
 Prawer, S.S. Between Two Worlds: Jewish Presences in German and Austrian Film, 1910-1933. Berghahn Books, 2007.

External links

1885 births
1933 deaths
German male film actors
German male silent film actors
Film people from Frankfurt
20th-century German male actors